Philoctetes (Philoktētēs; English pronunciation: , stressed on the third syllable, -tet-) is a play by Sophocles (Aeschylus and Euripides also each wrote a Philoctetes but theirs have not survived). The play was written during the Peloponnesian War. It is one of the seven extant tragedies by Sophocles. It was first performed at the City Dionysia in 409 BC, where it won first prize. The story takes place during the Trojan War (after the majority of the events of the Iliad, but before the Trojan Horse).  It describes the attempt by Neoptolemus and Odysseus to bring the disabled Philoctetes, the master archer, back to Troy from the island of Lemnos.

Background
When Heracles was near his death, he wished to be burned on a funeral pyre while still alive. In the play Philoctetes, Sophocles references the myth in which no one but Philoctetes would light Heracles' funeral pyre, and in return for this favor Heracles gave Philoctetes his bow (seen in later texts, such as Ovid's Metamorphoses). Philoctetes left with the Greeks to participate in the Trojan War, but was bitten on the foot by a snake while walking on Chryse, a sacred ground. The bite caused him constant agony, and emitted a horrible smell. For this reason he was left by Odysseus and the Atreidai (sons of Atreus) on the desert island Lemnos.

Ten years pass, and the Greeks capture the Trojan seer Helenus, son of Priam. He foretells that they will need the master archer Philoctetes and the bow of Heracles to win the war. Odysseus sails back to Lemnos with Neoptolemus (son of Achilles) to get Philoctetes. The task is not easy, as Philoctetes bitterly hates Odysseus and the Greeks for leaving him there.

Synopsis
Sophocles' Philoctetes begins with their arrival on the island.  Odysseus explains to Neoptolemus that he must perform a shameful action in order to garner future glory—to take Philoctetes by tricking him with a false story while Odysseus hides.  Neoptolemus is portrayed as an honorable boy, and so it takes some persuading to get him to play this part.  To gain Philoctetes' trust, Neoptolemus tricks Philoctetes into thinking he hates Odysseus as well.  Neoptolemus does this by telling Philoctetes that Odysseus has his father's (Achilles) armor.  He tells Philoctetes that this armor was his right by birth, and Odysseus would not give it up to him.  After gaining Philoctetes' trust and offering him a ride home, Neoptolemus is allowed to look at the bow of Heracles.

Neoptolemus holds the bow while Philoctetes is going into an unbearable fit of pain in his foot.   Feeling ashamed, Neoptolemus debates giving it back to him.  Odysseus appears, and a series of arguments ensue.  Eventually Neoptolemus' conscience gains the upper hand, and he returns the bow.    After many threats made on both sides, Odysseus flees.  Neoptolemus then tries to talk Philoctetes into coming to Troy by his own free will, but Philoctetes does not agree. In the end, Neoptolemus consents to take Philoctetes back to Greece, even though that will expose him to the anger of the army.  This appears to be the conclusion of the play—however, as they are leaving, Heracles (now a deity) appears above them and tells Philoctetes that if he goes to Troy, he will be cured and the Greeks will win. Philoctetes willingly obeys him.

The play ends here.  When Philoctetes later fights in Troy, his foot is healed, and he wins glory,  killing many Trojans (including Paris).

Themes and ideas
The concept of having a moral high ground is a key aspect in this play. The play makes the spectator question what morality means to each person. Furthermore, the play makes one question the struggle between what is right for the individual versus what is right for the group. It is possible that this struggle is irreconcilable. More specifically, one can see this struggle by looking at what has happened to Philoctetes versus what the Greeks need.

Another theme is that of trauma. Philoctetes suffers wounds that do not heal. Furthermore, Philoctetes' suffering is now what defines him, yet Neoptolemus pretends not to know Philoctetes at first. In other words, Philoctetes' suffering should at least make him known, but it is as if his story is dead.

Contemporary adaptations

The Theatre of War Project 

The story of Philoctetes, dealing with the wounded man and the interwoven relationships with others, has been frequently noted. In 2005 Bryan Doerries, writer and director, began a series of readings of the play in the New York City area, noting the reactions of the audience to the reading, especially related to the reactions of audience members to the interaction of the suffering soldier and the conflicted caregiver. The project revolves around presenting such readings, especially to audiences of medical professionals and students.

A number of readings were followed by a panel discussion about doctor-patient relationships, involving presenters in psychiatry, physicians, and military medical personnel.

The concept has also been extended to training of medical students, such as a presentation also in 2007 to the first year medical class at Weill Medical College of Cornell University.<ref>{{cite web |first=Abigail |last=Zuger |title=The Difficult Patient, a Problem as Old as History (or Older, The Key Reporter (Phi Beta Kappa) |date=Spring 2008 |url=http://staging.pbk.org/AM/Template.cfm?Section=TKR_Archives&Template=/CM/ContentDisplay.cfm&ContentIDID=2674/ |url-status=dead |archive-url=https://web.archive.org/web/20061129202142/http://staging.pbk.org/AM/Template.cfm?Section=TKR_Archives |archive-date=2006-11-29 }}</ref> 

In 2008, at a conference dedicated to finding new ways to help US Marines recover from post-traumatic stress and other disorders after serving in Iraq or Afghanistan, four New York actors presented a dramatic reading from Philoctetes and Ajax.

 Fictional adaptations 
 Philoctetes also figures in Les Aventures de Télémaque (1699) by François Fénelon.
 The Cure at Troy by Seamus Heaney, based on Philoctetes Neutral Ground by Tom Stoppard, loosely based on Philoctetes (as stated in the introduction to Stoppard's collected television plays).
 The Man in the Maze by Robert Silverberg, a retelling of the play in a science fictional idiom.
 Heracles' Bow (short story) by Madeline Miller
 New Amsterdam (2018 TV series) season 2 episode 7 2019 episode Good Soldiers
 Paradise by Kae Tempest, performed at the Royal National Theatre in London in 2021 

Translations
 Thomas Francklin, 1759 – verse: full text
 Richard C. Jebb, 1904 – prose: full text
 Francis Storr, 1912 – verse
Kathleen Freeman, 1948 – verse OCLC 10111365
 E.F. Watling, 1953 - verse and prose
 David Grene, 1957 – verse
 Kenneth McLeish, 1979 – verse
 Gregory McNamee, 1986 – prose: full text
 Christopher Webber, 1989 – verse and prose
 Desmond Egan, 1991 poetic prose
 Seth L. Schein, 2003 – verse and prose
 Carl Phillips, 2003
 Ian C. Johnston, 2008 - verse: full text
 George Theodoridis, 2009 – prose: full text
 Bryan Doerries, 2014 – verse

Notes

Further reading

 Austin, N. 2011. Sophocles' Philoctetes and the Great Soul Robbery. Madison: Univ. of Wisconsin Press.
 Doerries, B. 2015. The Theater of War: What Ancient Tragedies Can Teach us Today. New York: Alfred A. Knopf.
 Falkner, T. M. 1998. "Containing Tragedy: Rhetoric and Self-representation in Sophocles’ Philoctetes". Classical Antiquity 17:25–58.
 Gardiner, C. P. 1987. The Sophoclean Chorus: A Study of Character and Function. Iowa City: Univ. of Iowa Press.
 Gill, C. 1980. "Bow, Oracle, and Epiphany in Sophocles' Philoctetes". Greece & Rome 27:137–146.
 Hall, E. 2012. "Ancient Greek Responses to Suffering: Thinking with Philoctetes". In Perspectives on Human Suffering. Edited by J. Malpas and N. Likiss, 155–169. Dordrecht, The Netherlands, and New York: Springer.
 Heaney, S. 1990. The Cure at Troy: A Version of Sophocles’s Philoctetes. London: Faber and Faber.
 Heath, M. 1999. "Sophocles’ Philoctetes: A Problem Play?" In Sophocles Revisited: Essays Presented to Sir Hugh Lloyd-Jones. Edited by J. Griffin, 137–160. Oxford: Oxford Univ. Press.
 Jameson, M. H. 1956. "Politics and the Philoctetes". Classical Philology 51:217–227.
 Long, A. A. 1968. Language and Thought in Sophocles: A Study of Abstract Nouns and Poetic Technique. University of London Classical Studies 6. London: Athlone.
 Schein, S. L. 2006. "The Iliad and Odyssey in Sophocles’ Philoctetes: Generic Complexity and Ethical Ambiguity". In Greek Drama III. Essays in Honour of Kevin Lee. Edited by J. F. Davidson, F. Muecke, and P. Wilson, 129–140. Bulletin of the Institute of Classical Studies'' supplement 87. London: Institute of Classical Studies.

External links

 Philoctetes at Perseus Digital Library
 Theatre of War - Readings and Discussion from Philoctetes
 

Medical ethics in fiction
Medical sociology
Odysseus
Philoctetes
Plays set in ancient Greece
Trojan War literature
Plays based on classical mythology